KMKY may refer to:

 KMKY (AM), a radio station (1310 AM) licensed to Oakland, California, United States
 KMKY, the ICAO code for Marco Island Airport
 "Knowing Me, Knowing You", a 1977 song by ABBA
 Knowing Me Knowing You with Alan Partridge (radio series), a BBC radio series
 Knowing Me Knowing You with Alan Partridge (TV series), a BBC television series based on the radio show